Harpalus praecurrens is a species of ground beetle in the subfamily Harpalinae. It was described by Schauberger in 1934.

References

praecurrens
Beetles described in 1934